Forse che sì forse che no (Maybe Yes, Maybe No) is a novel published in 1910 by Gabriele D'Annunzio. As all D'Annunzio's novels, Forse che sì forse che no echoes to a certain extent one of D'Annunzio's own experiences. In particular, this novel echoes D'Annunzio's summer of "erotic frenzy with Donatella [Cross]." D'Annunzio originally planned to title the novel Vertigine. He later attempted to change even Forse che sì forse che no, because they made him notice that the rhythm matched the Neapolitan popular song Funiculì, Funiculà. It is considered the "last great D'Annunzian novel."

Plot 
The novel is set in the world of aviation that was blossoming at the time; it describes the development of passions that bind and divide five bourgeois characters, which are fatally destined to leave a "trail" of pain and death.

The story revolves around the birth of a violent love affair between Paolo Tarsis and Isabella Inghirami. In the background, the stories of Vanina and Lunella, sisters of Isabella, and of Aldo, brother of the three, intertwine.

The painful discovery of the love story between Paolo and Isabella by Aldo and Vanina causes a precipitous fall towards suicidal tendencies: Aldo and Vanina together attempt suicide by leaning out of a crumbling wall. Vanina is in fact in love with Paolo, but Isabella, although aware of this love, continues her affair with Paolo. At first, Aldo's motivations are not understood, it then emerges towards the end of the novel that he has sexual relations with his sister Isabella.

Vanina goes to Paolo to reveal the relationship between her brother and her older sister. Paolo, furious, awaits Isabella's arrival on occasion of which he takes out his anger, beating and insulting her while his sister Vanina returns home and commits suicide.

From this moment the progressive crisis of Isabella begins, a character so far very sure and determined, which leads to an unstoppable madness, to the point that Isabella's father and stepmother are forced to hospitalize her in an institution without Paolo being able to find an alternative solution.

The love affairs are intertwined with two aerial races, in the first of which Giulio, a friend of Paolo, loses his life while the protagonist comes out victorious. The novel ends with Paolo's landing in Sardinia.

References

1910 novels
Italian novels
Aviation novels
Novels by Gabriele D'Annunzio